A list of Spanish-produced and co-produced feature films released in Spain in 1995.

Films

Box office 
The ten highest-grossing Spanish films in 1995, by domestic box office gross revenue, are as follows:

See also 
 10th Goya Awards

References

External links
 Spanish films of 1995 at the Internet Movie Database

1995
Spanish
Films